John William Douglas (6 November 1872 – 15 October 1905) was an Australian rules footballer who played with Carlton in the Victorian Football League (VFL).

References

External links 

Jack Douglas's profile at Blueseum

1872 births
Australian rules footballers from Melbourne
Carlton Football Club players
1905 deaths